Sir Ian Michael Cheshire (born 6 August 1959) is a British businessman, formerly chairman of Barclays UK, the ring-fenced UK subsidiary of Barclays. He stepped down on 1 January 2021 and was succeeded by Crawford Gillies. He is lead non-executive director for the Cabinet Office board, campaign chairman of Heads Together, chair of The Prince of Wales's Charitable Fund, chair of the independent charity, the Food, Farming and Countryside Commission, and a trustee of The Institute for Government. He was previously chief executive (CEO) of Kingfisher plc, a British multinational retailing company, and was chairman of the British department store chain Debenhams from 2016 to 2019.

Education
Cheshire was educated at The King's School, Canterbury, and graduated in economics and law from Christ's College, Cambridge in 1980.

Career
Cheshire's first job was with Boston Consulting Group, before working for Guinness, as Ernest Saunders' executive assistant, and Sears, before joining Kingfisher as strategy director in 1998. He subsequently ran E KIngfisher, the e-commerce division which acquired Screwfix. After that he was CEO international before becoming CEO of B&Q in 2005.

In January 2008, Kingfisher appointed Cheshire as group chief executive.

In 2012, Cheshire won The Guardian Sustainable Business Leader of the Year award. His vision of B&Q "customers renting power drills as opposed to buying them" (drills are used for a mere six minutes a year on average) has captured imaginations, and is a widely used example of a mainstream business adopting a more collaborative approach to its products and services.

He was knighted in the 2014 New Year Honours for services to business, sustainability, and the environment.

In September 2014, it was announced that Véronique Laury would replace Cheshire as CEO of Kingfisher from February 2015.

In January 2015 it was announced that he would succeed Lord Browne as lead non-executive director for the government. He was also the senior independent director of Whitbread plc until 2017 and the chair of the advisory board of the Cambridge institute of sustainability leadership until 2015

In January 2016 he was nominated as chairman-elect of Debenhams, the international department store group. On 7 April 2016, he succeeded Nigel Northridge who had been chairman since April 2010. He was voted off the board on 10 January 2019.

References

1959 births
Living people
People educated at The King's School, Canterbury
Alumni of Christ's College, Cambridge
British chief executives
Knights Bachelor
Businesspeople awarded knighthoods